The 1977 Utah State Aggies football team was an American football team that represented Utah State University as an independent during the 1977 NCAA Division I football season. In their second season under head coach Bruce Snyder, the Aggies compiled a 4–7 record and were outscored by opponents by a total of 249 to 117.

Schedule

References

Utah State
Utah State Aggies football seasons
Utah State Aggies football